Sapolai Yao (born 15 September 1982) is a Papua New Guinean long-distance runner. He competed in the 3000 metres steeplechase at the 2015 World Championships in China without reaching the final.

Competition record

Personal bests
1500 metres – 4:11.48 (Brisbane 2004)
3000 metres – 8:45.55 (Brisbane 2006)
5000 metres – 15:28.94 (Brisbane 2006)
3000 metres steeplechase – 9:28.00 (Adelaide 2007)

References

External links

1982 births
Living people
Papua New Guinean male long-distance runners
Papua New Guinean steeplechase runners
World Athletics Championships athletes for Papua New Guinea
Place of birth missing (living people)
Athletes (track and field) at the 2006 Commonwealth Games
Athletes (track and field) at the 2010 Commonwealth Games
Commonwealth Games competitors for Papua New Guinea
Male steeplechase runners
Oceanian Athletics Championships winners